Top seed Mikhail Youzhny claimed his second back to back ATP Challenger Tour title, having won the 2016 KPN Bangkok Open a week earlier. He beat Adam Pavlásek 6–4, 6–1 in the final.

Seeds

Draw

Finals

Top half

Bottom half

References
 Main Draw
  Qualifying Draw

Singles
KPN Bangkok Open II - Singles
 in Thai tennis